The 2011 Churchill Cup, the ninth and final edition of an annual international rugby union tournament, took place in Northampton, Esher, Gloucester and Worcester. This was just the second time in the tournament's history in which England played host.

Competitors
The three regular participants in the event — the senior national sides of the United States and Canada, and England's "A" (second-level) national side, the England Saxons, were joined by second year participants Russia and two first-time competitors: Italy A and Tonga. England Saxons fielded a very young, promising team, while Italy A picked a very experienced side, with many of the regulars for the main national team.

Format
The teams played in a round-robin format between two pools to decide the elimination matches. All six teams participate on the finals day: the two pool winners will compete in the Cup Final, the two runners-up will play in a Plate Final, and the two bottom-placed teams will meet in the Bowl Final.

Venues
The pool rounds were played at Franklin's Gardens in Northampton, Molesey Road in Esher and Kingsholm Stadium in Gloucester. The finals were played at Sixways Stadium in Worcester.

Fixtures and results

Pool stage

Pool A

Touch judges:
Llyr ApGeraint-Roberts
Andrew Watson
Television match official:
David Matthews
 This was the highest margin of win of any England national team over the United States.

Touch judges:
Luke Pearce
Stuart Terheege
Television match official:
Geoff Warren

Pool B

Touch judges:
Andrew Small
Ian Tempest
Television match official:
David Matthews

Touch judges:
David Rose
Roy Maybank
Television match official:
Geoff Warren

Finals

Bowl final

Plate final

Cup final

See also
Churchill Cup

References

2007
2011 rugby union tournaments for national teams
International rugby union competitions hosted by England
2010–11 in English rugby union
2010–11 in Italian rugby union
2011 in American rugby union
2011 in Canadian rugby union
2011 in Tongan rugby union
2011 in Russian rugby union